Francisco Gutiérrez Álvarez (born 3 June 1980) is a Spanish former racing cyclist. He notably finished second in the under-23 road race at the 2002 UCI Road World Championships and competed in the 2003 Vuelta a España

Major results

2002
 1st Overall Spanish Amateur Road Cycling Cup
 1st Santikutz Klasika
 1st Stage 5b Vuelta a Navarra
 2nd  Road race, UCI Under-23 Road World Championships
 National Under-23 Road Championships
2nd Road race
3rd Time trial
2003
 7th Clásica de Almería
2004
 8th Trofeo Luis Puig
2005
 1st Overall Spanish Amateur Road Cycling Cup
 3rd Overall Vuelta a Navarra
2006
 1st Overall Spanish Amateur Road Cycling Cup
 1st Overall Vuelta a Cantabria
 1st Subida a Urraki
 1st Santikutz Klasika

References

External links

1980 births
Living people
Spanish male cyclists
Sportspeople from Barakaldo
Cyclists from the Basque Country (autonomous community)